Hypotia difformis is a species of snout moth in the genus Hypotia. It was described by Mark I. Falkovitsh in 1976 and is known from Kyzyl Kum in Central Asia.

References

Moths described in 1976
Hypotiini